FK Turbina Vreoci (Serbian Cyrillic: ФК Турбина Вреоци) is a football club based in Vreoci, Serbia. They currently play in the Serbian League Belgrade (Srpska liga Beograd), a third tier in Serbia's football league.

References

External links
 http://www.srbijasport.net/klub/771/rez Club profile and squad] at Srbijafudbal

Football clubs in Serbia
Association football clubs established in 1945
1945 establishments in Serbia